Ozan is a town in Hempstead County, Arkansas, United States. The population was 85 at the 2010 census. It is part of the Hope Micropolitan Statistical Area.

Geography
Ozan is located at  (33.848961, -93.721461).

Demographics

As of the census of 2000, there were 81 people, 33 households, and 26 families residing in the city. The racial makeup of the city was 53.09% White, 41.98% Black or African American, 4.94% from other races. 4.94% of the population were Hispanic or Latino of any race.

There were 33 households, out of which 18.2% had children under the age of 18 living with them, 63.6% were married couples living together, 15.2% had a female householder with no husband present, and 21.2% were non-families. 21.2% of all households were made up of individuals, and none had someone living alone who was 65 years of age or older. The average household size was 2.45 and the average family size was 2.77.

In the city the population was spread out, with 14.8% under the age of 18, 12.3% from 18 to 24, 27.2% from 25 to 44, 30.9% from 45 to 64, and 14.8% who were 65 years of age or older. The median age was 42 years. For every 100 females, there were 118.9 males. For every 100 females age 18 and over, there were 109.1 males.

The median income for a household in the city was $33,333, and the median income for a family was $34,167. Males had an income of $17,500 versus $16,528 for females. The per capita income for the city was $12,977. There were 6.3% of families and 3.5% of the population living below the poverty line, including none under 18 and 14.3% of those over 64.

Music 
Avant-Rock band The Residents 2010 EP, 'Ozan' is named after Ozan, Arkansas.

References

External links
 Encyclopedia of Arkansas History & Culture entry

Towns in Hempstead County, Arkansas
Towns in Arkansas
Hope micropolitan area